Rest on the Flight into Egypt is a c. 1515 oil on panel painting by the Flemish artist Joachim Patinir, who painted the main figures of Madonna and Child and a foreground still-life. The background landscape includes colours not usually found in Patinir's work and so is thought to have been produced by other hands. It is now in the Gemäldegalerie, Berlin.

Bibliography
  Paul Dupouey, Le Temps chez Patinir, le paradoxe du paysage classique : thèse de doctorat, Université de Nancy II, 2007-2008, 533 p.
 Reindert L. Falkenburg, Joachim Patinir : Landscape as an image of the pilgrimage of life, Amsterdam and Philadelphia, John Benjamins Publishing Company, 1988.
  Godfridus Johannes Hoogewerff, « Joachim Patinir en Italie », Revue de l'Art, vol. XLV, 1928, p. 131-132.
 Robert A. Koch, Joachim Patinir, Princeton, Princeton University Press, 1968, 116 p.
  Alain Tapié (ed.), Fables du paysage flamand ; Bosch, Bles, Brueghel, Bril, Paris, Somogy éditions d'art, 2012, 368 p.
  Alejandro Vergara (ed.), Patinir, estudios y catálogo crítico, Madrid, Museo National del Prado, 2007, 408 p.
  Guy de Tervarent, Attributs et symboles dans l'art profane. Dictionnaire d'un langage perdu (1450-1600), Genève, Droz, 1997, 588 p.

Paintings by Joachim Patinir
1510s paintings
Patinier
Paintings in the Gemäldegalerie, Berlin